Atrauli is a town and a municipal board in Aligarh district in the state of Uttar Pradesh, India.

Atrauli is famous for a variety of Chaat, Tikki, Panipuri (Fastfood) in all over India. These items are prominently found in the North Indian Cuisine.

Etymology
The name of the town is taken from Atri Muni who visited Atrauli.

History
During the 18th century Rao Durjan Singh Ponia of Bijauli took possession of Atrauli.

Geography 
It has an average elevation of 136 metres (446 feet).

Demographics
As per 2011 Indian Census, Atrauli had a population of 50,412, of which 26,368 were males and 24,044 were females. Atrauli has an average literacy rate of 47.5%, with 53.4% of the males and 41.1% of females literate. Population in the age range of 0 to 6 years was 7,254. The Scheduled Castes and Scheduled Tribes have a population of 4,568 and 2 respectively. Atrauli had 8093 household in 2011.

Notable people

 Nanua Chaprasi, Hindu spiritual guru and saint.
 Chandra Bhanu Gupta, Ex-Chief Minister of Uttar Pradesh three times. Ghamandi Singh Arya IPS special duty operation for Nagaland.
 Khadim Hussain Khan, Indian classical singer of Agra gharana.
 Sharafat Hussain Khan, Indian classical music singer.
 Ustad Alladiya Khan, founder of the Jaipur-Atrauli gharana school of music.
 Ravikant Nagaich, Hindi film director.
 Ashok Singhal, National President of Vishwa Hindu Parishad
 Kalyan Singh, Two-time Chief Minister of Uttar Pradesh, former member of Parliament for Lok Sabha, ex-Governor of Himachal Pradesh and former Governor of Rajasthan.

References 

Cities and towns in Aligarh district